Maksym Eduardovych Dolhov (born 16 June 1996, in Zaporizhia) is a Ukrainian diver.

Career
He has won multiple European championships medals, including the 2016 gold medal in mixed 10 m platform synchro. He competed at the 2016 Summer Olympics in Rio, finishing 6th with Oleksandr Horshkovozov in the men's synchronized 10 metre platform event.

See also
Ukraine at the 2015 World Aquatics Championships

References

Ukrainian male divers
1996 births
Sportspeople from Zaporizhzhia
Living people
Divers at the 2016 Summer Olympics
Olympic divers of Ukraine
21st-century Ukrainian people